The 1990 All-Ireland Senior Camogie Championship was the high point of the 1990 season. The championship was won by Killkenny who defeated Wexford by a ten-point margin in the final.

Semi-finals
Kilkenny goalkeeper Marie Fitzpatrick, drove a long free all the way to the Cork net in an exciting semi-final against Cork. After Liz O'Neill regained the lead for Cork, Marion McCarthy could batted a dropping ball from Ann Downey into the path of Marina Downey who tapped the ball into the net for Kilkenny’s winning goal. Two late goals from Barbara Redmond were not enough to gain Dublin a place in the final against an experienced Wexford team., for whom Paula Rankin’s goal at the start of the second half proved crucial.

Final
Wexford took the lead in the first minute when Siobhan Dunne scored, but it was to be their last score from play in the entire game. Angela Downey scored the game’s only goal two minutes from the end.

Final stages

 
MATCH RULES
50 minutes
Replay if scores level
Maximum of 3 substitutions

See also
 All-Ireland Senior Hurling Championship
 Wikipedia List of Camogie players
 National Camogie League
 Camogie All Stars Awards
 Ashbourne Cup

References

External links
 Camogie Association
 All-Ireland Senior Camogie Championship: Roll of Honour
 Historical reports of All Ireland finals* Camogie on facebook
 Camogie on GAA Oral History Project

1990 in camogie
1990